I Made a Game with Zombies in It! (officially stylized as I MAED A GAM3 W1TH Z0MBIES 1N IT!!!1), is a zombie-themed multidirectional shooter video game for the Xbox 360, available through the Xbox Live Indie Games service. Released in 2009, it was developed by Ska Studios and was designed entirely by company founder James Silva, previously best known for the Xbox Live Arcade game The Dishwasher: Dead Samurai. The game was developed using Microsoft XNA, though its tongue-in-cheek description claims it was made using "Hypermagic Engine 3.0 and the Megacore X parallelization processor." The game's title makes excessive comic usage of features of Internet writing, such as leetspeak, overuse of exclamation marks, and typographical errors.

Gameplay
The game features one to four protagonists viewed from an aerial perspective. Using two analog sticks, the players shoot droves of attacking zombies while collecting power-ups, with the objective of surviving until the game's background song ends. It features a rock-style background song sung by Silva himself with lyrics about the game itself. The song, which shares the same title as the game, was made available for download on the official Ska Studios website. The song was also released through the Rock Band Network, about a year after the game's release. Silva said Xbox Live's indie game price point inspired him to make "a $1 experience that delivers." He did not expect it to be a success, and that he was "half-expecting it to fail for being too stupid of a game."

Reception
The game was ranked 2009's most popular Xbox Live Indie Game based on connectivity. It sold 160,000 copies by January 2010, making it the top-selling Xbox Live Indie Game by more than 40,000 units. Zombies went on to sell 200,000 copies by March 2010 and jumped to 308,000 in sales by August 2010  making Silva roughly $215,000 after Microsoft's 30 percent revenue fee. The game became a favorite with critics, and was noted for its quirky sense of humor and theme song. IGN ranked it the best independent game of 2009. IGN writer Erik Brudvig said the game was extremely entertaining and "somehow about as insane as its title," despite the simple controls. I Made a Game with Zombies in It! won the 2009 Inside Gaming Award for Best Indie Game.

References

External links
Xbox Live Marketplace website

2009 video games
Indie video games
Microsoft games
Microsoft XNA games
Multidirectional shooters
Video games developed in the United States
Video games with commentaries
Windows Phone games
Xbox 360 games
Xbox 360 Live Indie games
Video games about zombies
Multiplayer and single-player video games
Ska Studios games